Boris Mikhailovich Iofan (April 28, 1891 – March 11, 1976) was a Soviet architect of Jewish origin, known for his Stalinist architecture buildings like 1931 House on the Embankment and the 1931–1933 winning draft of the Palace of the Soviets.

Background 
Born in Odesa, Iofan graduated in 1916 from Italy's Regio Istituto Superiore di Belle Arti (now Accademia di Belle Arti) in Rome with a degree in architecture, initially following the Neoclassical tradition. His first major work was a Barvikha sanatorium for the Party elite (1929), which introduced him to clients at the top of the state.

In 1931, Iofan completed the elite block-wide House on the Embankment (official name Дом Правительства, Government Building). The structure, containing 505 apartments, two theaters and retail stores, became an iconic example of early Stalinism. Boris Iofan was a lifelong resident of this building.

Palace of Soviets 
Iofan's entry to the Palace of Soviets contest won in 1932 (first prize was actually split among three competing entries, but eventually Joseph Stalin awarded the job to Iofan). His design was awarded a gold medal during the 1937 International Exposition dedicated to Art and Technology in Modern Life in Paris. The Cathedral of Christ the Saviour, a monument initiated by Alexander I (and consecrated by Alexander III), was razed for construction of the palace (before the contest began). Construction proceeded slowly; in response to the Nazi invasion of the Soviet Union as part of Operation Barbarossa, in June 1941 construction work was halted at a time when the structure's steel frame stood 50 metres high. The frame was subsequently disassembled and scrapped for weapons production. In 1958, the Moscow Swimming Pool was erected at the site, after construction of the palace was abandoned. This open-air pool was eventually shut down and the cathedral was rebuilt at the same location in 1994–1995.

Iofan designed the Soviet Pavilions at the World Expo in Paris (1937) and New York (1939). Later, he bid for the Moscow State University skyscraper project in Moscow (1947); the job was awarded to Lev Rudnev. In his later years, Iofan was awarded the title of People's Architect of the USSR (October 20, 1970).

Projects
1925 - Building on Rusakovskaya Street, 7
1927 - Russian State Agrarian University – Moscow Timiryazev Agricultural Academy, Administrative building, Kolkhoz building
1928-1931 - First House of Soviets of the CEC and SNK of the USSR (House on the Embankment)
1931 - Designing the Palace of the Soviets
1935 - Sanatorium of the Medical and Sanitary Management of the Kremlin "Barvikha" (now clinical sanatorium "Barvikha")
1937 - Pavilion of the international exhibition in Paris and the idea of the sculpture by V. Mukhina Worker and Kolkhoz Woman
1938 - ZiS Culture House (then the cinema and branch No. 1 of the Amo Palace of Culture "ZiL", now the Leisure Center in the Zyuzino area on Simferopol Boulevard, 4)
1939 - Soviet pavilion of the exhibition in New York
1938-1944 - Baumanskaya metro station
1944-1947 - Laboratory of Academician Pyotr Kapitsa
Reconstruction and restoration of the Vakhtangov Theater 
1947-1948 - Projects of Stalin high-rises, buildings of the Moscow University
1957 - Moscow Central Clinical Hospital, 15 Marshal Timoshenko Street, Kuntsevo District, Moscow
1962-1975 - Complex of apartment buildings in Moscow on Shcherbakovskaya Street (houses No. 7, 9, 11, co-authors D. Alekseev, N. Chelyshev, A. Smekhov)
1972 - Russian State University of Physical Education, Sport, Youth and Tourism (last implemented project)

Literature
 Berkovich, Gary. Reclaiming a History. Jewish Architects in Imperial Russia and the USSR. Volume 2. Soviet Avant-garde: 1917–1933. Weimar und Rostock: Grunberg Verlag. 2021. P. 145. 
 Deyan Sudjic. Stalin's Architect: Power and Survival in Moscow. Cambridge: The MIT Press. 2022. 
 Vladimir Sedov. Stalin's Architect: The Rise and Fall of Boris Iofan. Berlin: DOM Publishers. 2022.

See also
Stripped Classicism

References

External links
 Boris Iofan, Project for the People's Commissariat for Heavy Industry, Moscow, perspective drawing and photographs of various projects, Canadian Centre for Architecture (digitized items)

1891 births
1976 deaths
20th-century Russian architects
Architects from Odesa
Communist Party of the Soviet Union members
Stalin Prize winners
Recipients of the Order of Lenin
Recipients of the Order of the Red Banner of Labour
Recipients of the Order of the Red Star
Odesa Jews
Jewish architects
Russian architects
Russian urban planners
Soviet architects
Soviet urban planners
Burials at Novodevichy Cemetery